{{DISPLAYTITLE:C10H16O4}}
The molecular formula C10H16O4 (molar mass: 200.23 g/mol, exact mass: 200.1049 u) may refer to:

 Camphoric acid
 2-Decendioic acid

Molecular formulas